Charles Prince Seigneur (27 April 187218 July 1933) was a French-born film actor and comedian, best known for his screen persona "Rigadin" in numerous short slapstick comedies. He was also known as "Moritz" in Germany, "Whiffles" in England and the US, and "Tartufini" in Italy. He was the second biggest film star in the world in the years leading up to World War I, just behind his rival Max Linder. Prince's "Rigadin" character was similar to Linder's "Max" in that they were both upper-class dandys that were constantly getting into trouble with authority figures and love interests. Prince began his acting career on the stage and was hired by Pathé Frères in 1908. He made over 200 films as "Rigadin" from 1909 until 1920. By 1920 his popularity had faded and he played supporting roles in a handful of films in the 1920s and 1930s.  Two of his Rigadin shorts, Rigadin Directeur de Cinéma and Rigadin et le Chien de la Baronne, were preserved by the Academy Film Archive in 2010.

Personal life 
In 1900 he married Aimée Campton, an English dancer working in Paris Their only daughter was Renée Petitdemange (1901-1993). The couple divorced in April 1905 Prince's great-grandson is French film director Cris Ubermann.

Selected filmography

1912 Rigadin Peintre Cubiste
1912 Rigadin aux Balkans
1913 Rigadin, Winetaster
 A Royal Family (1915)
 Kiss Me (1929)
 Departure (1931)
 His Highness Love (1931)
 Buridan's Donkey (1932)
 His Best Client (1932)

References

External links

Charles Prince; IBDb.com

1872 births
1933 deaths
French male film actors
French male silent film actors
Silent film comedians
Slapstick comedians
20th-century French male actors